This is a list of team owners and executives of the Oakland Athletics.

Team owners

(List does not include various owners of minority interests during the years.)

Team executives

Dave Kaval, President 2016–present
Billy Beane, General Manager 1998–2015; VP Baseball Operations 2015–present
David Forst, General Manager 2015–present
Michael Crowley, President 1998–2016
Sandy Alderson, President 1993–1995, 1997–1998; General Manager 1983–1998
Walter J. Haas, President 1990–1992
Roy Eisenhardt, President 1981–1986
Billy Martin, Director Of Player Development/General Manager 1981–1982
Charles O. Finley, General Manager (de facto, 1961–1980)
Frank Lane, General Manager 1960–1961
Parke Carroll, General Manager 1959–1960
Mickey Cochrane, General Manager 1950
Arthur Ehlers, General Manager 1951-53
Connie Mack General Manager (1901–1950)
(Incomplete list.)

See also

Oakland
Owners and executives